Estadio Independencia is a multi-use stadium in Estelí, Nicaragua.  It is currently used for football matches and is the home stadium to Real Estelí.

The stadium holds 5,000 people, and has been renovated and equipped with synthetic turf in order for it to be used by Real Estelí for their home matches in the group stage of the 2012–13 CONCACAF Champions League.

Hooliganism
In April 2004, an explosive went off in the stands during the national football league final between Real Estelí and Diriangén, seriously injuring 14 people.

References

Football venues in Nicaragua
Estelí Department
Estelí